The 67th Fighter Wing was a unit of the United States Air Force for four years, between 1946 and 1950. It was located at Logan Airport, in Boston, Massachusetts. It is unrelated to the modern 67th Network Warfare Wing.

History

World War II
The 6th Air Defense Wing was organized as a command and control organization for Eighth Air Force.  Deployed to England in July 1943 and initially was used to organize air defense units.   Transferred to VIII Fighter Command and controlled fighter-escort groups for 1st Bombardment Division B-17 Flying Fortress units engaged in strategic bombardment of enemy targets in Occupied Europe and Nazi Germany. Inactivated in November 1945.

Post war
After the war, the 67th Fighter Wing was activated at Logan Airport in Boston, Massachusetts. The National Guard Bureau began a major expansion of its air units. Massachusetts was allotted the 67th, which consisted of the 101st Fighter Squadron, the 131st Fighter Squadron, the 132nd Fighter Squadron, the 202nd Air Service Group, 601st Signal Construction Company, 101st Communications Squadron, 101st Air Control Squadron, 151st Air Control and Warning Group, 567th Air Force Band, 101st Weather Flight and the 1801st Aviation Engineer Company. The 67th Fighter Wing was assigned to Air Defense Command. The wing was Extended federal recognition and activated on 15 October 1946.

At the end of October 1950, the Air National Guard converted to the wing-base Hobson Plan organization. As a result, the wing was withdrawn from the Massachusetts ANG and was inactivated on 31 October 1950.  The 102d Fighter Wing was established by the National Guard Bureau, allocated to the commonwealth of Massachusetts, recognized and activated 1 November 1950; assuming the personnel, equipment and mission of the inactivated 67th Fighter Wing.

Assignments

Major Command/Gaining Command
 Eighth Air Force, 15 June 1943
 VIII Fighter Command, 26 August 1943 – 21 November 1945
Air National Guard/Continental Air Command (1946–1950)
 Massachusetts Air National Guard, 15 October 1946 – 31 October 1950

Previous designations
 Constituted as 6th Air Defense Wing on 14 June 1943
 Activated on 15 June 1943
 Re-designated 67th Fighter Wing in July 1943
 Inactivated on 21 November 1945.
 Allotted to the Massachusetts ANG on 24 May 1946
 Extended federal recognition and activated on 15 October 1946
 Inactivated, and returned to the control of the Department of the Air Force, on 31 October 1950
 Disbanded on 15 June 1983

Units assigned

Components

World War II
 20th Fighter Group: 26 August 1943 – 11 October 1945
 352d Fighter Group: 7 July 1943 – 27 January 1945
 356th Fighter Group: 5 October 1943 – 4 November 1945
 359th Fighter Group: October 1943 – November 1945
 364th Fighter Group: February 1944 – November 1945

Air National Guard
102nd Fighter Group 22 October 1946 – 31 October 1950
101st Fighter Squadron
101st Communications Squadron
101st Air Control Squadron
101st Weather Flight
104th Fighter Group
131st Fighter Squadron
101st Fighter Group 4 April 1947 – 31 October 1950 (Maine ANG)
132nd Fighter Squadron
202nd Air Service Group
601st Signal Construction Company
151st Air Control and Warning Group
567th Air Force Band
1801st Aviation Engineer Company

Bases stationed
 Bedford Army Air Base, Massachusetts, 15 June – 4 August 1943
 Walcot Hall (AAF-372), England, c. 26 August 1943
 RAF Troston (AAF-595), England, c. 25 October – 21 November 1945.
 Logan Airport, Boston, Massachusetts, 15 October 1946 – 31 October 1950

Aircraft operated
P-51D Mustang (1950)
P-80C Shooting Star (1948–1950)
P-47D Thunderbolt (1947–1948)

References

 Maurer, Maurer, Air Force Combat Units of World War II, Office of Air Force history (1961). 

Wings of the United States Air National Guard
067
Military in Boston
0067
Logan International Airport
Military units and formations disestablished in 1983